Club Deportivo Béjar Industrial is a Spanish football team based in Béjar, in the autonomous community of Castile and León. Founded in 1951, it plays in Regional Preferente, holding home matches at Campo de Fútbol Mario Emilio.

Season to season

33 seasons in Tercera División

External links
 
ArefePedia team profile 
Fútbol Regional profile 
Soccerway team profile

Football clubs in Castile and León
Association football clubs established in 1951
1951 establishments in Spain
Province of Salamanca